The 1967 European Baseball Championship was held in Belgium and was won by Belgium. Great Britain finished as runner-up.

The two major forces in European baseball, Netherlands and Italy, who competed in the last five finals before 1967 between them, didn't take part.

Standings

References
  European Championship Archive at honkbalsite

European Baseball Championship
European Baseball Championship
1967
1967 in Belgian sport